John Kearney, D.D. (c.1742–1813) was the Church of Ireland Bishop of Ossory from 1806 to 1813.

Born c. 1742 in Dublin, the son of a barber-surgeon, Kearney was elected a Scholar of Trinity College Dublin in 1760 and a Fellow in 1764. He held the Chair of Oratory from 1781 until his appointment as Provost in July 1799. Kearney was nominated Bishop of Ossory on 4 January and appointed by letters patent on 20 January 1806. He was consecrated at Trinity College Chapel on 2 February 1806, by Charles Agar, Archbishop of Dublin, assisted by Charles Lindsay, Bishop of Kildare and Nathaniel Alexander, Bishop of Down and Connor. Kearney died in office at Kilkenny on 22 May 1813.

He was elected a Fellow of the Royal Society in May 1806.

An oil on canvas painting of him by William Cuming exists.

He was a great-great-great-granduncle of Barack Obama.

References

1740s births
1813 deaths
Anglican bishops of Ossory
Fellows of the Royal Society
Fellows of Trinity College Dublin
Obama family
Provosts of Trinity College Dublin